Ndubisi Chukunyere (born 23 December 1979 in Lagos, Nigeria) is a former Nigerian footballer who last played for Maltese Premier League side Hibernians, in the capacity of striker.

Playing career
Chukunyere began his career as a member of Stationery Stores, then moved to Kano Pillars before moving to Malta. He made his international debut for Nigeria when he played in a friendly match against Egypt in Lagos, and was in talks to join the Super Eagles.

In 2001, Chukunyere was named one of the most prolific African scorers in the current European season by the BBC. The following year, he was named Best Foreign Player at the Malta Football Awards. In 2003, a Qatari club attempted to buy Chukunyere but the offer was turned down as his club, Hibernians, had asked for a million dollars.

Now a Maltese citizen, he is in the staff team with Hibernians. He is the father of  Junior Eurovision 2015 winner, as well as Eurovision 2021 contestant, singer Destiny Chukunyere.

References

External links
 Ndubisi Chukunyere at MaltaFootball.com
 

Living people
1979 births
Nigerian footballers
Nigerian expatriate footballers
Nigeria international footballers
Hibernians F.C. players
Valletta F.C. players
Vittoriosa Stars F.C. players
Expatriate footballers in Malta
Sportspeople from Lagos
Nigerian expatriate sportspeople in Malta
Kano Pillars F.C. players
Maltese people of Nigerian descent
Association football forwards